Arachán were one of the native nations of Uruguay. Their origin is not very well-known, but some scholars consider them to be different from other local ethnicities. They were said to have come from the Inca Highlands (currently Bolivia and Peru) thousands of years ago. Their name is composed of two elements: "eastern", "oriental" + "Canna", as they used to cultivate Cannaceae as staple food.

Legacy
Nowadays the people of Cerro Largo Department are sometimes known as "arachanes", in memory of this extinct local ethnicity. There is also a small seaside resort in Rocha Department known as Arachania. The rivuline Austrolebias arachan was named after them as well.

References

External links
  

Indigenous peoples in Uruguay
History of Uruguay
Indigenous peoples of the Southern Cone